Nornes may refer to:

Places
Nornes, Norway, a village in Sogndal municipality, Sogn og Fjordane county, Norway

People
Jan Frode Nornes, a retired Norwegian footballer
Bud Nornes, a Minnesota (USA) politician and member of the Minnesota House of Representatives